Porphyrochroa palliata is a species of dance flies, in the fly family Empididae.

References

Empididae
Insects described in 1902
Insects of Mexico
Diptera of North America